August Hermann Franke Onsrud (19 October 1885 – 4 October 1945) was a Norwegian sports shooter. He competed in two events at the 1924 Summer Olympics.

References

External links
 

1885 births
1945 deaths
Norwegian male sport shooters
Olympic shooters of Norway
Shooters at the 1924 Summer Olympics
People from Vestre Toten
Sportspeople from Innlandet